Olga Meyer (8 August 1930 – 27 August 2018) was a Norwegian journalist and radio host.

She was born in Fana, and was educated as schoolteacher from Volda Teachers' College. She was assigned with NRK Radio from 1969. She was awarded  in 1981, and was named honorary member of Noregs Mållag in 2000.

She died in Oslo in 2018.

Selected works
Dyrehistorier i Nitimen (1996)

References

1930 births
2018 deaths
Mass media people from Bergen
Volda University College alumni
Journalists from Bergen
Norwegian radio personalities
NRK people
Schoolteachers from Bergen
Nynorsk-language writers